Whack Records is an independent record label founded by members of Australian dance group, Sneaky Sound System, Daimon Downey and Angus McDonald.

Artists
Sneaky Sound System

Discography

Numbers

Whack Numbers
WHACK numbers are a system by which official Sneaky Sound System releases are chronologically ordered (much like that of Nine Inch Nails' Halo system).  They correspond to the sequence in which the releases were made, and are named by the word "WHACK," which precedes the number on the release.  WHACK numbers are sometimes modified for alternate versions of a release, such as the multiple releases of Sneaky Sound System.  Promotional-only releases do not have their own WHACK numbers.
   

Sneaky Sound System era (2004–2007)
 WHACK01 – "Hip Hip Hooray"
 WHACK02 – "Tease Me"
 WHACK03 – "I Love It"

 WHACK04 – Sneaky Sound System
 WHACK04X - Sneaky Sound System - Bonus Tracks
 WHACK04CE - Sneaky Sound System - Collector's Edition
 WHACK05 – "Pictures"
 WHACK06 – "UFO"
 WHACK07 – "Goodbye"

2 era (2008)
 WHACK08 – "Kansas City"
 WHACK09 – 2
 WHACK09BONUS - 2, Bonus Remix Disc
 WHACK09USB - 2, USB release
 WHACK10 – "When We Were Young"
 WHACK11 – "Kansas City" - 12" vinyl
 WHACK12 – "When We Were Young" - 12" vinyl
 WHACK13 – "16"
 WHACK14 – "16" - 12" vinyl

WHACKV
WHACKV numbers are a system by which official Sneaky Sound System vinyl releases are chronologically ordered.  They correspond to the sequence in which the releases were made, and are named by the word "WHACKV," which precedes the number on the release.
   

Sneaky Sound System era (200?–2007)
 WHACKV01 – "???"
 WHACKV02 – "I Love It"
 WHACKV03 – "Pictures"
 WHACKV04 – "UFO"
 WHACKV05 – "Goodbye"

SNEAK numbers
SNEAK numbers are another system to catalog Sneaky Sound System releases, similar to the WHACK system used for major releases.  Although it is used in the same manner as the WHACK numbers, SNEAK numbers have only seemed to be found on the UK releases.

 SNEAK1
 SNEAK1CD – "Pictures" - CD Single
 SNEAK1V1 – "Pictures" - 7" vinyl
 SNEAK1V2 – "Pictures" - 12" vinyl
 SNEAK2
 SNEAK2CD1 – "UFO" - CD Single
 SNEAK2CD2 – "UFO" - CD Single
 SNEAK2V – "UFO" - 12" vinyl

References

External links 
 Official Sneaky Sound System Website
 Sneaky Sound System on Myspace
 Official Sneaky Sound System YouTube

Australian independent record labels
Sneaky Sound System
Rock record labels
Record labels established in 2004
Record labels based in Sydney